The Qiam 1 (Persian:  قیام-١, "Uprising-1") is a short-range ballistic missile designed and built by Iran. It was developed from the Iranian Shahab-2, a licensed copy of the North Korean Hwasong-6, all of which are versions of the Soviet Scud-C missile.

Development
The Qiam 1 was first seen in footage of an August 2010 test, then publicly displayed in a parade in October 2010. On 22 May 2011, Iranian Defense Minister Ahmad Vahidi announced that the missile was being delivered to the 
Aerospace Force of the Islamic Revolutionary Guard Corps, although a US report noted deliveries in May 2010.

Design
The Qiam 1 is a variant of the Scud missile. Its lack of fins reduces the missile's radar signature, particularly during ascent when fins can act as radar reflectors. Removing fins from a missile also reduces the structural mass, so the payload weight or missile range can be increased. Without the fins and associated drag, the missile can be more responsive to changes in trajectory.

Iranian sources cite an improved guidance system on the missile, and analysts note that adjusting the missile's in-flight trajectory without fins requires a highly responsive guidance system. The Qiam 1's accuracy is also improved with the addition of a separable warhead—since only the warhead needs to survive re-entry most missiles have structurally weak bodies which can cause an attached warhead to tumble as the body breaks apart. Attachments visible in pictures of the warhead may show antennas for controlling the missile's trajectory by radio.

The shape of the warhead on the Qiam 1 resembles that used on Iran's Shahab-3. The "baby-bottle" design can shift the center of gravity and center of pressure to compensate for changes in payload weight from earlier cone-shaped warheads; can increase drag which results in increased stability during reentry (at the expense of range) and, potentially, increase accuracy; and can increase the terminal velocity of the warhead, making it harder to intercept.

In an interview with the Fars News Agency, General Farahi reported "that the range of Qiam differs in accordance with its mission, meaning that the missile can hit targets in different distances according to its mission plan."

Multiple platforms may be used to launch the Qiam 1, and its launch and preparation time have been reduced compared to other Scud variants. The integration of GPS or another navigation system could be used to reduce preparation time and improve accuracy by better locating the missile in relation to its target.

Operational history
 
Test launches of the Qiam 1 occurred on 20 August 2010, 10 February 2014, and 9 March 2016. The Qiam 1 was used in combat for the first time on 17 June 2017 when Iran targeted Islamic State militants in Syria as retaliation for earlier bomb attacks in Tehran. At least two missiles hit the Islamic State stronghold of Mayadin.

Qiam 1 missiles also struck US/Iraqi Al Asad Airbase in Iraq on 8 January 2020, destroying a Black Hawk helicopter, an air control tower and several tents. The main runway and an MQ-1 Predator drone were damaged. Two American soldiers who had been manning guard towers were blown from their posts and wounded during the missile attacks, and it was later disclosed that 109 US servicemen suffered traumatic brain injury. Some of them were evacuated to Kuwait and Germany for medical treatment.

Extended range versions of the Qiam-1 operated by the Houthis in Yemen have flown more than 900 km.

The missile were fitted with cluster warheads, according to the Iranian military. The strike was in retaliation for the killing of General Qasem Soleimani during an attack launched by the USAF with an MQ-9 Reaper drone on 3 January 2020.

Potential Use in Yemen
Houthi forces in Yemen have unveiled two Scud-based mobile short-range ballistic missiles: the Burkan 1 and Burkan 2-H. On 4 November 2017, Saudi Arabia claimed to have intercepted a Burkan 2-H over its capital, Riyadh, with a MIM-104 Patriot. It reportedly was aimed at King Khalid International Airport. According to the US State Department, the missile was actually a Qiam. Saudi Arabia's Ministry of Culture and Information supplied the Associated Press with pictures from a military briefing of what it claimed were components from the missile bearing Iranian markings matching those on other pictures of the Qiam 1. Joint Forces Command of the Arab Coalition detailed the evidence. There have also been reports of previous attempts by Iran to send missiles to Yemen.

Operators

See also 
 Islamic Republic of Iran Armed Forces
 Defense industry of Iran
 List of military equipment manufactured in Iran
 Islamic Revolutionary Guard Corps Aerospace Force
 Science and technology in Iran
 Shahab-3
 Hwasong-6
 Volcano H-2

External links 
Footage of the First Launch

References

Ballistic missiles of Iran
Short-range ballistic missiles of Iran
Theatre ballistic missiles
Military equipment introduced in the 2010s